The Ministry of External Relations is the Angolan government ministry which oversees the foreign relations of Angola. Tete António is the current foreign minister since 9 April 2020.

List of Ministers

See also 
 Foreign relations of Angola

References

External links 
  Ministry of External Relations
 https://web.archive.org/web/20110227033407/http://www.angola.gov.ao/ - Angolan government portal (Portuguese only)
 http://www.angola.org - Angolan embassy in USA

External Relations
Foreign relations of Angola
Angola